Slavic palatalization may refer to:
Slavic first palatalization, the first palatalization affecting the Slavic languages
Slavic second palatalization, the second palatalization affecting the Slavic languages
 the so-called Slavic third palatalization or progressive palatalization in Common Slavic